Suzuki RG 500 gamma was a racing motorcycle manufactured by Suzuki from 1981 to 1984 for competition in the Grand Prix motorcycle racing series. The motorcycle was powered by a 500 cc two stroke engine.

The bike debuted in 1981 replacing the Suzuki RG 500. The Roberto Gallina-Suzuki team won two consecutive riders world championships in the 500cc class with Marco Lucchinelli in 1981 and Franco Uncini in 1982.

Rg 500 gamma
Grand Prix motorcycles